Vijaygad Fort  /  is a fort located 60 km from Chiplun, in Ratnagiri district, of Maharashtra. This fort is located north of the Jaigad Fort on the northern bank of shastri river creek.

History 
Much less history is known about this fort. It is a small fort about an acre in area, it is surrounded by a ditch on the three sides. In 1862 the walls were found to be in ruins and had only one gun. there was no garrison and no water.

How to reach
The nearest town is Chiplun and Guhagar. The fort is close to village Tavsal. A wide motorable road leads to the entrance gate of the fort. It takes about 10 minutes to have a walk around the fort.

Places to see
There is one entrance gate in the fort with some fortification.

See also 
 List of forts in Maharashtra
 List of forts in India
 Marathi People
 Maratha Navy
 List of Maratha dynasties and states
 Maratha War of Independence
 Military history of India
 List of people involved in the Maratha Empire

References 

Buildings and structures of the Maratha Empire
Forts in Ratnagiri district
16th-century forts in India